Joseph Rooney may refer to:
Joseph Rooney (priest) (died 1857), Irish missionary priest
Joseph Ó Ruanaidh, né Joseph Rooney, author in the field of digital watermarking
Joe Rooney (born 1963), Irish actor and comedian
Joe Rooney (American football) (1898–1979), football player from Ottawa, Ontario
Joe Rooney (footballer) (1917–1941), English footballer
Joe Don Rooney (born 1975), musician
Joey Rooney, fictional character